A.H. Riise Spirits is a spirits company based in Dragør, Denmark established in 1838.

History
The company takes its name after Albert Heinrich Riise who established a production of rum on Saint Thomas in the Danish West Indies where he was appointed to pharmacist in 1839. The current company was established as United Spirits Brands when A.H. Riise Rum, Tranquebar Gin, London Dock Rum and Kronborg Akvavit were merged into one company in 2016. The company adopted the name  A.H. Riise Spirits after its most well-known brand in 2018.

Brands
AH Riise Spirits includes;

 A.H. Riise Rum (1838)
 Santos Dymont Rum 
 Tranquebar Gin (1616)
 Humphrey Taylor Gin
 London Dock Rum (1770)
 Kronborg Akvavit
Helsingor Spritfabrik (1849)

References

External links
 Official website

Drink companies of Denmark
Food and drink companies based in Copenhagen
Companies based in Dragør Municipality
Danish companies established in 2016